is a passenger railway station located in the city of Sōka, Saitama, Japan, operated by the private railway operator Tōbu Railway.

Line
Yatsuka Station is served by the Tōbu Skytree Line, and is 15.9 kilometers from the terminus of the line at Asakusa Station.

Station layout
The station has one elevated island platform with two tracks. The station building is located underneath the platforms. There are additional tracks for express trains to bypass this station.

Platforms

History
The station opened on 1 October 1925. From 17 March 2012, station numbering was introduced on all Tōbu lines, with Yatsuka Station becoming "TS-15".

Passenger statistics
In fiscal 2019, the station was used by an average of 38,681 passengers daily.

Surrounding area
Yatsuka Post Office

See also
 List of railway stations in Japan

References

External links

 Tobu Station information 

Railway stations in Japan opened in 1925
Tobu Skytree Line
Stations of Tobu Railway
Railway stations in Saitama Prefecture
Sōka